Rene Tammist (born 5 July 1978 in Tartu, Estonia) is an Estonian politician, serving as Minister of Entrepreneurship and Information Technology of the Republic of Estonia in the cabinet of Prime Minister Jüri Ratas since August 22, 2018.

Education 
Tammist graduated from Tartu Secondary School No. 7 (Tartu Karlova School) in 1996 and received his bachelor's degree in public administration from Tartu University in 2001. He holds a master's degree in public policy and administration from Manchester University. Since 2006 Tammist has been enrolled at University College London’s PhD program. In 2009 he participated in the US Congress’ Trans-Atlantic climate and energy policy exchange program

Professional career 
2001–2002 Advisor to the Foreign Minister of the Republic of Estonia

2004–2011 Energy and climate policy advisor to the Socialists and Democrats Group at the European Parliament

2007–2009 Supervisory board member of Eesti Energia

2009–2011 Supervisory board member of the Estonian Climate and Energy Agency

2011–2012 Lecturer on EU energy and climate policy at Tartu University

2011–2018 Executive director at the Estonian Renewable Energy Association

2012–2018 European Parliament appointed member of the Administrative Board of the Agency for the Cooperation of Energy Regulators

2014–2018 Supervisory board member of Kredex Foundation

2018– Minister of Entrepreneurship and Information Technology

Political career 
Member of the Estonian Social Democratic Party since 1996. Tammist was sworn in as Minister of Entrepreneurship and Information Technology on August 22, 2018.

Hobbies 
History and long-distance running.

1978 births
Living people
Politicians from Tartu
Government ministers of Estonia
21st-century Estonian politicians